Aleister Crowley (12 October 1875 – 1 December 1947) was a highly prolific writer, not only on the topic of Thelema and magick, but on philosophy, politics, and culture. He was also a published poet and playwright and left behind many personal letters and daily journal entries. The following list contains works published and edited by other hands after Crowley's death.

Libri

Many of the important works of Aleister Crowley are in the form of Libri (lit. "books"), which are usually short documents consisting of core teachings, methodologies, practices, or Thelemic scripture. All the libri are given a number in the Roman numeral system, and those that are part of the A∴A∴ curriculum are assigned a "class" as follows:

 Class [A] consists of books of which may be changed not so much as the style of a letter:  that is, they represent the utterance of an Adept entirely beyond the criticism of even the Visible Head of the Organization.
 Class [B] consists of books or essays which are the result of ordinary scholarship, enlightened and earnest.
 Class [C] consists of matter which is to be regarded rather as suggestive than anything else.
 Class [D] consists of the Official Rituals and Instructions.
 Class [E] consists of manifestos, broadsides, epistles and other public statements. Some publications are composite, and pertain to more than one class.

Books

The following list encompasses both Libri and other works, including those compiled or edited by others after Crowley's death.

777 and Other Qabalistic Writings of Aleister Crowley : Including Gematria & Sepher Sephiroth. (1982). York Beach, ME : S. Weiser. 
Aha! : Being Liber CCXLII. (1996). Tempe, Arizona: New Falcon Publications. 
Aleister Crowley and the Practice of the Magical Diary. (2006). Tempe, AZ : New Falcon Publications. 
Amrita : Essays in Magical Rejuvenation. (1990). Kings Beach, CA : Thelema Publications.  
"The Blue Equinox" (Equinox III:1). (1992). York Beach, ME : Samuel Weiser. 
The Book of the Law (Technically called Liber AL vel Legis sub figura CCXX as delivered by XCIII = 418 to DCLXVI). (1997). York Beach, ME : Samuel Weiser.  
The Book of Lies, which is also falsely called Breaks, originally 1912 or 1913, (1981). York Beach, ME : Samuel Weiser. 
The Book of Thoth : A Short Essay on the Tarot of the Egyptians (Equinox III:5), originally 1944, (1981). New York : S. Weiser. 
Clouds without Water. (1909). Illinois : Yogi Publication Society. 
Collected Works of Aleister Crowley 1905-1907. (1974). New York : Gordon Press. 
Commentaries on the Holy Books and Other Papers (Equinox IV:1). (1996). York Beach, ME : S. Weiser. 
The Confessions of Aleister Crowley : An Autohagiography. (1979). London; Boston : Routledge & Kegan Paul. 
Crowley on Christ. (1974). London: The C.W. Daniel Co.Ltd. 
Diary of a Drug Fiend. (1970). York Beach, ME : S. Weiser. 
Eight Lectures on Yoga (Equinox III:4). (1985).  Phoenix, AZ : Falcon Press. 
Enochian World of Aleister Crowley : Enochian Sex Magick. (1991). Scottsdale, AZ : New Falcon Publications. 
The Equinox (I:1-10). (2006).York Beach, ME : Weiser Books. 
The Equinox (III:10). (2001). York Beach, ME : S. Weiser. 
The Equinox of the Gods (Equinox III:3). (1992). York Beach, ME : Samuel Weiser. 
Gems from the Equinox. (1982).Phoenix, AZ : Falcon Press. 
The General Principles of Astrology (Liber DXXXVI). First edition, 1917; Boston, MA: Weiser Books, 2002. 
The Goetia : The Lesser Key of Solomon the King. (1995). York Beach, ME : Samuel Weiser.  
The Heart of the Master. (1973). Montreal : 93 Publishing. 
The Holy Books of Thelema (Equinox III:9). (1983). York Beach, ME : S. Weiser. 
Khing Kang King : The Classic of Purity, Being Liber XXI. (1980). Kings Beach, CA : Thelema Publications. 
Konx Om Pax : Essays in Light. (1990). Chicago: Teitan Press.  
The Law is for All : The Authorized Popular Commentary of Liber AL vel Legis sub figura CCXX, The Book of the Law. (1996). Tempe, AZ : New Falcon Publications. 
Liber Aleph vel CXI : The Book of Wisdom or Folly (Equinox III:6). (1991). York Beach, ME : Samuel Weiser. 
Little Essays Toward Truth. (1991). Tempe, AZ : New Falcon Publications. 
The Magical Diaries of Aleister Crowley : Tunisia 1923. (1996). York Beach, ME : S. Weiser. 
The Magical Record of the Beast 666: The Diaries of Aleister Crowley, 1914-1920. (1972). London : Duckworth. 
Magick : Liber ABA, Book Four, Parts I-IV. (1997). York Beach, ME : S. Weiser. 
Magick Without Tears. [First Edition 1973] (1982). Phoenix, AZ : Falcon Press. 
Moonchild. (1972). London : Sphere. 
The Qabalah of Aleister Crowley : Three Texts. (1973). New York, NY : Samuel Weiser. 
The Revival of Magick and Other Essays. (1998). Tempe, AZ : New Falcon Publications. 
Rites of Eleusis: As Performed at Caxton Hall. (1990). Thame : Mandrake Press. 
The Scrutinies of Simon Iff. (1987). Chicago: Teitan Press. 
Shih Yi: A critical and mnemonic paraphrase of the Yi King by Ko Yuen (Equinox III:8). (1971). Oceanside, CA. : H. P. Smith. ASIN B0006DYW0U
The Spirit of Solitude. (1929). Mandrake Press: London. The first two volumes of an intended six of Crowley's autobiography ('Autohagiography'). The six volumes first appeared in omnibus form as The Confessions of Aleister Crowley: An Autohagiography in 1989 (see above).
The Stratagem and other Stories. (1929). London : Mandrake Press.
Tannhäuser : A Story of All Time. (1907). United Kingdom: Society for the Propagation of Religious Truth. ; (1974). New York : Gordon Press. 
The Tao Teh King : A New Translation (Equinox III:8). (1976). Kings Beach, CA : Thelema Publications. 
The Vision & the Voice : With Commentary and Other Papers (Equinox IV:II). (1998). York Beach, ME : S. Weiser. 
The World’s Tragedy. (1985). Phoenix, AZ : Falcon Press.

Poetry

Aceldama, A Place to Bury Strangers In. (1974). New York : Gordon Press.  (CW)
Ahab, and Other Poems.  (1974). New York : Gordon Press.  (CW)
Aleister Crowley: Selected Poems. (1986). London : Crucible. 
The Argonauts. (1974). New York, NY : Gordon Press.  (CW)
Clouds without Water. (1974). New York, NY : Gordon Press. 
Gargoyles: Being Strangely Wrought Images of Life and Death. (1974). New York : Gordon Press. 
Golden Twigs. (1988). Chicago: Teitan Press. 
Jephthah. (1974). New York : Gordon Press.  (CW)
Jezebel, and Other Tragic Poems. (1974). New York : Gordon Press.  (CW)
Orpheus: A Lyrical Legend. (1974). New York : Gordon Press.  (CW)
The Scented Garden of Abdullah the Satirist of Shiraz, cover title Bagh-i-Muattar. (1991). Chicago: Teitan Press. .Snowdrops from a Curate's Garden. (1986). Chicago: Teitan Press. Songs for Italy.Songs of the Spirit. (1974). New York : Gordon Press.  (CW)The Soul of Osiris: Comprising the Temple of The Holy Ghost and The Mother’s Tragedy. (1974). New York : Gordon Press. The Star and the Garter. (1974). New York : Gordon Press.  (CW)The Sword of Song: Called by Christians, The Book of the Beast. (1974). New York : Gordon Press.  (CW) White Stains. (1973). London : Duckworth. The Winged Beetle''. (1992). Chicago, IL: Teitan Press. 
Note: A number of the above collections (marked "CW") can be found in their entirety in Collected Works of Aleister Crowley 1905-1907.

Other
 Thoth tarot deck

External links
OTO-USA web library

Crowley, Aleister

Crowley, Aleister
Crowley, Aleister